Institutes of technology or polytechnic institutes are technologically focused universities, many dating back to the mid-19th century. A handful of American universities include the phrases Institute of Technology, Polytechnic Institute, Polytechnic University, University of Technology or similar phrasing in their names; these are generally research-intensive universities with a focus on Science, Technology, Engineering and Mathematics (STEM).

In the lists below, an asterisk (*) denotes research-intensive universities that offer up to PhD or DSc degrees.

Institutes of technology
Air Force Institute of Technology* (a graduate school and provider of professional and continuing education that is part of the United States Air Force)
California Institute of Technology*
Florida Institute of Technology*
Georgia Institute of Technology*
Illinois Institute of Technology* (formerly known as Armour Institute of Technology)
Indiana Institute of Technology
Lake Washington Institute of Technology
Massachusetts Institute of Technology*
New England Institute of Technology
New Mexico Institute of Mining and Technology*
New Jersey Institute of Technology* (formerly known as Newark College of Engineering)
New York Institute of Technology*
Oklahoma State University Institute of Technology
Rochester Institute of Technology*
Rose–Hulman Institute of Technology (Indiana)
Stevens Institute of Technology* (New Jersey)
Washburn Institute of Technology (Kansas)
Wentworth Institute of Technology (Boston)
West Virginia University Institute of Technology

Polytechnic universities
Arizona State University Polytechnic campus
California Polytechnic State University, San Luis Obispo
California State Polytechnic University, Humboldt
California State Polytechnic University, Pomona
Florida Polytechnic University
Kansas State University Polytechnic Campus
Oregon Institute of Technology (officially designated as Oregon's Polytechnic University)
Rensselaer Polytechnic Institute*
SUNY Polytechnic Institute
University of Wisconsin–Stout (officially designated as Wisconsin's Polytechnic University)
Virginia Polytechnic Institute and State University*
Worcester Polytechnic Institute*

Technological universities 
Arkansas Tech University
Clarkson University
Colorado School of Mines*
Colorado Technical University
University of Central Florida (formerly Florida Technological University)*
Harrisburg University of Science and Technology
Iowa State University*
Lawrence Technological University
Louisiana Tech University
Michigan Technological University*
Montana Technological University
Missouri University of Science and Technology* (formerly University of Missouri-Rolla)
Navajo Technical University
New York City College of Technology
South Dakota School of Mines and Technology*
Tennessee Technological University
Texas Tech University*
Utah Tech University
Vermont Technical College
Wichita State University Campus of Applied Sciences and Technology

Contrast to technical colleges
Conversely, schools dubbed "technical colleges" or "technical institutes" generally provide post-secondary training in technical and mechanical fields focusing on training vocational skills primarily at a community college level -- parallel and sometimes equivalent to the first two years at a bachelor's-granting institution.  The academic level of these schools varies by course of study; some courses are geared toward immediate employment in a trade, while others are designed to transfer into a four-year program.  Some of these technical institutes are for-profit organizations (such as ITT Technical Institute) compared to most other non-profit educational institutes.

Former schools

Former institutes of technology
Carnegie Institute of Technology (merged to form Carnegie Mellon University*)
Case Institute of Technology (merged to form Case Western Reserve University*)
Drexel Institute of Technology (now known as Drexel University*)
General Motors Institute of Technology (now known as Kettering University)
Lawrence Institute of Technology (now known as Lawrence Technological University*)
 State University of New York Institute of Technology (merged to form State University of New York Polytechnic Institute)
University of Minnesota Institute of Technology (now known as University of Minnesota College of Science and Engineering)

Former polytechnic universities
The University of Akron (formerly designated as Ohio's Polytechnic University)
Alabama Polytechnic Institute (now known as Auburn University)
Arkansas Polytechnic College (now known as Arkansas Tech University)
Louisiana Polytechnic Institute (now known as Louisiana Tech University)
Brooklyn Collegiate and Polytechnic Institute (now known as New York University Tandon School of Engineering)
Rose Polytechnic Institute (now known as Rose-Hulman Institute of Technology)
Southern Polytechnic State University (merged into Kennesaw State University)
Tennessee Polytechnic Institute (now known as Tennessee Technological University)

See also 
 Institute of technology
 List of schools of mines
 List of institutions using the term "institute of technology" or "polytechnic"
 List of United States technological universities

Notes

References

Education in the United States
Engineering education
Vocational education